Green Blade Rising is the seventh studio album by the Levellers, released in 2002.

Track listing
All band members are given writer's credits on all the tracks except on "Believers" where Stratton (Paddy) is also credited.
"Four Winds" – 3:22
"Falling from the Tree" – 4:07
"Pretty Target" – 3:40
"Come on" - 2:25
"Pour" – 4:16
"Aspects of Spirit" – 3:45
"Wild as Angels" - 2:56
"Believers" – 3:04
"A Chorus line" – 2:48
"Not What We Wanted" – 3:20
"Wake the world" – 3:29

CD Bonus Track
"Galahad" - 2:43

Personnel

Musicians
Mark Chadwick - Singing, guitar, banjo
Simon Friend - guitar, vocals
Jonathan Sevink - violin, tin whistle
Charlie Heather - drums
Jeremy Cunningham - bass guitar, artwork
Matt Savage - keyboards, backing vocals

Rowan Godel - backing vocals
Tim O'Leary - whistles
Chopper - cello

Technical staff
Alan Scott - production
Jake Rousham - engineering
Alan Scott and Jon Sevink

References

Levellers (band) albums
2002 albums